CHFA may refer to:

 California Housing Finance Agency
 CHFA-FM, a radio station (90.1 FM) licensed to Edmonton, Alberta, Canada